Christchurch Borough Council in Dorset, England, existed from 1974 to 2019, when it was abolished and subsumed into Bournemouth, Christchurch and Poole Council.

Political control
The first elections to the council were held in 1973, initially operating as a shadow authority prior to the district coming into effect the following year. From 1973 until its abolition in 2019 political control of the council was held by the following parties:

Leadership
The role of mayor was largely ceremonial at Christchurch Borough Council. Political leadership was instead provided by the leader of the council. The leaders from 2003 until the council's abolition in 2019 were:

Council elections
Summary of the council composition after each election; click on the year for full details of each election. Boundary changes took place for the 2003 election, reducing the number of seats by one.

1973 Christchurch Borough Council election
1976 Christchurch Borough Council election
1979 Christchurch Borough Council election (New ward boundaries)
1983 Christchurch Borough Council election
1987 Christchurch Borough Council election
1991 Christchurch Borough Council election

Borough result maps

By-election results
By-elections occur when seats become vacant between council elections. Below is a summary of recent by-elections; full by-election results can be found by clicking on the by-election name.

References

External links
Dorsetforyou.com

 
Council elections in Dorset
District council elections in England